OCML may refer to:

 Open Configuration and Management Layer, a universal application configuration and management layer in computer systems
 OCML-VP, the Marxist–Leninist Communist Organization – Proletarian Way (French: Organisation communiste marxiste-léniniste - Voie prolétarienne)